The system for mail delivery in the United States has developed with the nation. Rates were based on the distance between sender and receiver in the early years of the nation. In the middle of the 19th century, rates stabilized to one price regardless of distance. Rates were relatively unchanged until 1968, when the price was increased every few years by a small amount. Comparing the increases with a price index, the price of a first class stamp has been steady. The logo for the Post Office Department showed a man on a running horse, even as the railroads and then motorized trucks and airplanes moved mail. In 1971, the Post Office became the United States Postal Service, with rates set by the Postal Regulatory Commission, with some oversight by Congress. Air mail became standard in 1975. In the 21st century, prices were segmented to match the sorting machinery in use; non-standard letters required slightly higher postage.

Postal rates to 1847
Initial United States postage rates were set by Congress as part of the Postal Service Act signed into law by President George Washington on February 20, 1792.  The postal rate varied according to "distance zone", the distance a letter was to be carried from the post office where it entered the mail to its final destination.  Rates were adopted in 1847 for mail to or from the Pacific Coast and in 1848 for mail sent from one place in the west to another place in the west.  There were double and triple rates as a letter's size increased. There were ship fees which were also added (i.e. mail to Hawaii). The ship fee, including the ship rate on letters for delivery at the port of entry, were on a per letter basis, rather than weight. The United States issued its first postage stamps in 1847. Before that time, the rates, dates and origin of the letter were written by hand or sometimes in combination with a handstamp device.

United States Postal Service
Since enactment of the Postal Reorganization Act of 1970, postage rates have been set by the Postal Regulatory Commission.

Historical rates

Historical trend

Plotting the data in the previous table yields the adjacent graph. The dark area shows the actual price of the stamp, while the light area shows the price adjusted for inflation, in 2019 U.S. cents.

This plot shows that, despite the nominal rise in the cost of a first-class stamp, the adjusted cost of a stamp has stayed relatively stable. Since at least the early 1980s, the price of a stamp has closely followed the consumer price index. The large jumps in the early 1900s are because a change by a single penny was large compared to the cost of the stamp. For example, the price increase from $0.02 to $0.03 on July 6, 1932, was a 50% increase in cost. Additionally, while the cost of the stamp itself remained fixed, the adjusted price in 2019 dollars was not fixed over time which added to larger jumps in adjusted prices.

Historical notes
Domestic parcel post service was adopted in 1913, 25 years after the Post Office had agreed to deliver international parcel post packages pursuant to the Universal Postal Union treaty and various bilateral agreements with other nations: 

Initially, few if any postal regulations governed packages mailed by parcel post. For example, to construct a bank in Vernal, Utah, in 1916, a Salt Lake City company ascertained that the cheapest way to send  of bricks to the building was by parcel post, and the company proceeded to do so. For another example, Charlotte May Pierstorff, then a  five-year-old, was mailed via parcel post in 1914; she survived, but the regulations were clarified to prohibit the use of parcel post for human transport.

Bulk postal rates were restructured in 1996:

 Second Class became Periodicals
 Third and Fourth Class Mail became Standard Mail (A) and (B)
 Special Fourth Class Mail was renamed Special Standard Mail

In 2007, First Class Mail was restructured to include variable pricing based on size, not just on weight.  Shape-based postage pricing is a form of dimensional weight. Also at that time, International Parcel Post air service was re-branded as Priority Mail International, and Parcel Post surface service was discontinued for international destinations.

Regular Air Mail service began in 1918 and over the years rates varied considerably depending on distance and technology. Domestic Air Mail, as a class of service, officially ended May 1, 1977. By that time all domestic First Class Mail was being dispatched by the most expeditious means, surface or air, whether or not the Air Mail postage had been paid.

Additional charges for Special Delivery existed from 1885 to 2001. Today, Express Mail Overnight is the most similar service level.

During the summer of 2010 the USPS requested the Postal Regulatory Commission to raise the price of a first class stamp by 2 cents, from 44 cents to 46 cents, to take effect January 2, 2011. On September 30, 2010, the PRC formally denied the request, but the USPS filed an appeal with the Federal Court of Appeals in Washington DC.

On September 25, 2013, the USPS announced a 3 cent increase in the First Class postal rate, to be effective January 26, 2014, increasing the price of a stamp to 49 cents. Bulk mail, periodicals, and package service rates were also increased by 6 percent. A loss of US$5 billion during the 2013 fiscal year was the reason given for the increase.

The legislation which set the price to 49 cents was enacted as a temporary measure and as an "exigent surcharge for mailing products and services". However, this legislation was set to expire in April 2016. As a result, the Post Office retained one cent of the price change as a previously allotted adjustment for inflation, but the price of a first class stamp became 47 cents: for the first time in 97 years (and for the third time in the agency's history, the price of a stamp decreased.)

See also

 United States postal abbreviations
 United States Postal Service creed

Unions of the U.S. Postal Service:
 American Postal Workers Union
 National Association of Letter Carriers
 National Postal Mail Handlers Union
 National Rural Letter Carriers' Association

History:
 Post Office Murals
 American Letter Mail Company
 Postage stamps and postal history of the United States of America

References

Sources
 First Class Mail Prices, 2010
 Rates for Domestic Letters Since 1863
 Rates for Stamped Cards and Postcards
 Consumer Price Index data
 Nondenomination Stamps FAQ
 Paying the Postage in the U.S., 1776–1921
 USPS Price List Notice 123

Further reading 
 Beecher, Henry W. and Anthony S. Wawrukiewicz. U.S. Domestic Postal Rates, 1872–2011.  Bellefonte, Pa.: American Philatelic Society, 2011. 

United States Postal Service
Postage stamps of the United States
USA
Postal history of the United States